Silvana Burtini (born May 10, 1969) is a Canadian former soccer player. A forward, she represented Canada at the 1995, 1999 and 2003 editions of the FIFA Women's World Cup. In 1998 Burtini was named Canadian Player of the Year and was part of the Canadian squad who won the CONCACAF Women's Championship. She has scored the third-most goals in Team Canada Women's Soccer history, with 38 in 77 games.

At Capilano College, Burtini was BCCAA Player of the Year and a CCAA All-Canadian in 1992–93.

As a member of the Vancouver Police Department, Burtini was presented with the British Columbia Police Award of Valour for saving a life in 2004.

International goals

References

External links
 
 / Canada Soccer Hall of Fame
 Burtini at Women's United Soccer Association

Living people
1969 births
Canadian sportspeople of Italian descent
Canadian women's soccer players
Canada women's international soccer players
Women's association football forwards
Soccer people from British Columbia
1995 FIFA Women's World Cup players
1999 FIFA Women's World Cup players
2003 FIFA Women's World Cup players
USL W-League (1995–2015) players
Women's United Soccer Association players
Carolina Courage players
Raleigh Wings players
Expatriate women's soccer players in the United States
Canadian expatriate sportspeople in the United States